Norm Demers is a retired U.S. professional soccer defender who spent one season in the North American Soccer League.

In 1978, Demers played for the Fort Lauderdale Strikers of the North American Soccer League.  In 1979, he played for the Fort Lauderdale Saints of the Southern Soccer League.  In 1980, he played for the Cleveland Cobras in the American Soccer League.

References

External links
NASL stats

American Soccer League (1933–1983) players
American soccer players
Fort Lauderdale Strikers (1977–1983) players
Cleveland Cobras players
North American Soccer League (1968–1984) players
Living people
Association football defenders
Year of birth missing (living people)